Premi Barça Jugadors (Barça Players Award) is a prize which is awarded by the Barça Players' Association to the Barcelona's first team player who has shown most fair play throughout the season. 

The award is decided by a jury of Association members of the club. In 2017–18, it was the first time ever that Barcelona's players were involved in the voting process. 

Xavi is the only player to win the award on two occasions.

Winners

See also
 Trofeo Aldo Rovira
 Joan Gamper Trophy

References

External links 
 FC Barcelona Official Website
Premi Barça Jugadors (Barça Players Award)

FC Barcelona
Spanish football trophies and awards